Rufus Ezekiel Lester (December 12, 1837 – June 16, 1906) was a U.S. Representative from Georgia.

Born near Waynesboro, Georgia, Lester graduated from Mercer University, Macon, Georgia, in 1857. He studied law. He was admitted to the bar in Savannah, Georgia, and commenced practice in 1859. He entered the military service of the Confederate States Army in 1861 and served throughout the Civil War. He resumed the practice of law in Savannah. He served as member of the Georgia State Senate in 1870–1879 and served as president of that body during the last three years. He served as mayor of Savannah from 1883 to 1889. He was also a slave owner.

Lester was elected as a Democrat to the Fifty-first and to the eight succeeding Congresses and served from March 4, 1889, until his death in Washington, D.C., on June 16, 1906. He served as chairman of the Committee on Expenditures in the Department of State (Fifty-second and Fifty-third Congresses).

Death 
He died after an accident in which he fell through a skylight on the roof of The Cairo, the Washington, D.C. apartment building where he resided. Lester went to the roof to look for his two young grandchildren and apparently missed his footing, fell about 30 feet through the skylight, and landed on the building's eleventh floor. He broke both legs and sustained internal injuries which proved fatal.

He was interred at Bonaventure Cemetery in Savannah, Georgia.

See also
List of United States Congress members who died in office (1900–49)

References

External links

1837 births
1906 deaths
Mayors of Savannah, Georgia
Confederate States Army personnel
People from Burke County, Georgia
Democratic Party members of the United States House of Representatives from Georgia (U.S. state)
Democratic Party Georgia (U.S. state) state senators
American slave owners
19th-century American politicians
Accidental deaths from falls